Roseophilin is an antibiotic isolated from Streptomyces griscovirides shown to have antitumor activity. The chemical structure can be considered in terms of two components, a macrotricyclic segment and a heterocyclic side-chain.  Several laboratory syntheses of roseophilin (e.g., those of Trost, Fürstner, Salamone) are based upon the Paal-Knorr synthesis, and two others are based on the Nazarov cyclization reaction (those of Tius, Frontier). The compound is related to the prodiginines.

References

Antibiotics
Pyrroles
Furans
Chloroarenes
Phenol ethers